The  2013 Beijing Guoan F.C. season  was their 10th consecutive season in the Chinese Super League, established  in the 2004 season, and 23rd consecutive season in the top flight of Chinese football. They competed at the Chinese Super League, AFC Champions League and Chinese FA Cup.

First team
As of September 28, 2013

Transfers

Winter

In:

Out:

Summer

In:

 
  
 
 

Out:

Staff

|}

Friendlies

Competitions

Chinese Super League

Table

Matches

Chinese FA Cup

AFC Champions League

Group stage

Knock-out stage

Round of 16

References

Beijing Guoan F.C. seasons
Chinese football clubs 2013 season